A Bite of China is a Chinese documentary television series on the history and traditions of food, dining, and cooking in China directed by Chen Xiaoqing, narrated by Li Lihong with original music composed by Roc Chen. It first aired 14 May 2012 on China Central Television and quickly gained high ratings and widespread popularity. The seven-episode documentary series, which began filming in March 2011, introduces the history and story behind foods of various kinds in more than 60 locations in mainland China, Macau and Hong Kong. The documentary has also been actively encouraged as a means of introducing Chinese food culture to those unfamiliar with local cuisine. Various notable chefs such as Shen Hongfei and Chua Lam were consultants on the project.

A second season of A Bite of China, also consisting of seven episodes (plus trailer), aired from 18 April to 6 June 2014. The third season was aired from 19 to 26 February 2018, during the Chinese New Year holiday.

Foods Featured

Season 1

Season 2 
Some of these English translations are based on China Daily so may not be accurate.

Reception 
A Bite of China attracted high ratings during its nightly airing on CCTV-1, drawing an estimated 100 million viewers. It also has an overall approval rating of 91% on Douban.  Oliver Thring of  The Guardian praised it as "the best TV show I've ever seen about food. I'd hazard it's the best one ever made."

Controversy  
In the Episode 2 of the Season 3, the voice-over indicates that Huifang as a community in Xi'an dates back to Tang dynasty. The remark was refuted by a history scholar, Yu Gengzhe. Yu commented on Weibo that where present-day Huifang located, was the Central Secretariat of Tang, along with the barracks of the imperial guards. And a mosque supposedly was sited there in the Song dynasty. Some of the portrayal of certain areas within the series have also been criticized.

The background Chinese painting appeared in the documentary's poster is "Ridge cloud with rain" by Xu Qinsong. At first, the poster designer used the painting without permission of Mr. Xu, However, this copyright issue was later solved by reconciliation between the artist and the documentary producer.

International Broadcast 
 -8TV (Malaysia)

References

External links 
English Official Site

Chinese cuisine
Chinese television shows
2012 Chinese television series debuts
Chinese documentary television series
China Central Television original programming